Stanley William Tracey  (30 December 1926 – 6 December 2013) was a British jazz pianist and composer, whose most important influences were Duke Ellington and Thelonious Monk. Tracey's best known recording is the 1965 album Jazz Suite Inspired by Dylan Thomas's "Under Milk Wood", which is based on the BBC radio drama Under Milk Wood, by Dylan Thomas.

Early career
The Second World War meant that Tracey had a disrupted formal education, and he became a professional musician at the age of sixteen as a member of an ENSA touring group playing the accordion, his first instrument. He joined Ralph Reader's Gang Shows at the age of nineteen, while in the RAF and formed a brief acquaintance with the comedian Tony Hancock. Later, in the early 1950s, he worked in groups on the transatlantic liners Queen Mary and Caronia and toured the UK in 1951 with Cab Calloway. By the mid-1950s, he had also taken up the vibraphone, but later ceased playing it. At this time he worked widely with leading British modernists, including drummer Tony Crombie, clarinettist Vic Ash, the saxophonist-arranger Kenny Graham and trumpeter Dizzy Reece.

In February 1957, he toured the United States with Ronnie Scott's group, and became the pianist with Ted Heath's Orchestra in September for two years (1958–59), including a US tour with singer Carmen McRae. Although Tracey disliked Heath's music, he gained a regular income and was well featured as a soloist on both piano and vibes, and contributed compositions and arrangements that stayed in the Heath book for many years. The following year he recorded his first album as leader, Showcase, for English Decca (also Heath's label) and Little Klunk in 1959; he had first recorded in 1952 with the trumpeter Kenny Baker. At Decca Records, Tracey met his future wife, Jackie Buckland (3 April 1929 – 13 August 2009); the couple had two children Clark and Sarah.

At Ronnie's and the Under Milk Wood LP
From March 1960 until about 1967 (some sources give 1968), Tracey was the house pianist at Ronnie Scott's Jazz Club in Soho, London, and he had the opportunity to accompany many of the leading musicians from the US who visited the club. Recordings of some of these performances appeared on LP, while others appeared on the Jazz House and Harkit labels, recorded by the journalist Les Tomkins, but with non-professional recording equipment. Which working at Scott's club, Tracey gained some high-profile admirers; Sonny Rollins asserted at one concert: "Does anyone here know how good he is?". It is Tracey on piano that film viewers hear behind Rollins on the soundtrack of the Michael Caine version of Alfie (1966).

However, the experience of working in Scott's club affected Tracey's health; the long hours led to him taking various illicit stimulants, and the low wages also meant that he had to take the workman's bus back home to Streatham at 3am.

At the same time, he became active too in Michael Horovitz's New Departures project, mixing poetry performances with jazz, where the musicians interacted spontaneously with the words. The New Departures group recorded an album in 1964 with saxophonist Bobby Wellins, a partnership that continued for several decades. Both men contributed original compositions to the album.

Tracey's 1965 album (its full title is Jazz Suite Inspired by Dylan Thomas's "Under Milk Wood") is one of the most celebrated jazz recordings made in the United Kingdom. Tracey was inspired to compose the suite by hearing the original 1953 BBC broadcast on an LP his wife Jackie had acquired. The track "Starless and Bible Black", a quote from the opening monologue, is probably the best demonstration of Wellins' lyricism and the highlight of Tracey's whole career. Such is the affection with which these pieces are held that Tracey has re-recorded them on several occasions, something that is unusual for British jazz musicians to do. Under Milk Wood was followed by Alice in Jazzland, an album for big band, the next year featuring many of his former Ted Heath colleagues. Later in the decade, Tracey made the arrangements for an Acker Bilk record, Blue Acker, and his first album dedicated to Duke Ellington compositions (both recorded in 1968), in this case to commemorate Ellington's 70th birthday the following year.

Experimentation and consolidation
The early 1970s were a bleak time for Tracey. Around 1970, he almost chose to retrain as a postman under pressure from the Unemployment Benefits' office – "I would have quite a good pension by now" he quips – but his wife, formerly involved in public relations, took a more direct role in the development of Tracey's career.

He began to work with musicians of a later generation, who worked in a free or avant-garde style, including Mike Osborne, Keith Tippett and John Surman. Tracey continued to work in this idiom with Evan Parker at the UK's Appleby Jazz Festival for several years, but this was always more of a sideline for Tracey, who said that he "took more out of free music into the mainstream than I did from mainstream into free". Neil Ferber founder and organiser of the Appleby Jazz Festival built the festival around Stan Tracey and the musicians who worked with him, booking Stan to appear at every festival for the 18 years that it existed.

In the mid-1970s he formed his own record label, Steam, and through it reissued Under Milk Wood (the major label that held the rights to it had allowed it to fall out of print). Over the next decade he also used the outlet to issue recordings of a number of commissioned suites. These included The Salisbury Suite (1978), The Crompton Suite (1981) and The Poets Suite (1984).

He led his own octet from 1976 to 1985 and formed a sextet in 1979 (later called Hexad), touring widely in the Middle East and India. In this context he had a longstanding performance partnership from 1978 with saxophonist (and physician) Art Themen, and his own son, the drummer Clark Tracey. He was able to share the billing with arranger Gil Evans in a 1978 concert at the Royal Festival Hall, such was Tracey's pre-eminence in the UK. In private, he played Ellington recordings for Evans that the latter had not previously heard. Tracey continued to record with American musicians on occasion as well, with dates taking place with Sal Nistico in 1985 and Monk associate, Charlie Rouse in 1987.

The Steam label ceased trading in the early 1990s, reportedly because of difficulties caused by the retail trade's need for its inventory to carry a barcode. However, in 1992 Tracey benefited from Blue Note's brief interest in UK musicians, leading to the Portraits Plus album and the commercial issue of the BBC's recording of the concert commemorating the 50th anniversary of Tracey's first professional gig, as well as Under Milk Wood′s debut on CD.

In 1995 his new quartet featuring Gerard Presencer recorded the For Heaven's Sake album and also performed gigs together. In 2003 Tracey was the subject of a BBC Television documentary Godfather of British Jazz, a rare accolade nowadays for any jazz musician, let alone one from Britain. Tracey's catalogue from the LP era is being reissued on ReSteamed Records.

Already an Officer of the Order of the British Empire (OBE), he was appointed Commander of the Order of the British Empire (CBE) in the 2008 New Year Honours.

Tracey died of cancer on 6 December 2013; he was survived by his son, Clark Tracey; his daughter died in 2012.

Discography

As leader
Year given for the original releases is the year of recording wherever possible.
 Showcase (Vogue, 1958)
 Little Klunk (Vogue, 1959)
 The 1959 Sessions (ReSteamed, 2022)
 The New Departures Quartet (Transalantic,1964; Hot House, 1999) – with Bobby Wellins
 Jazz Suite Inspired by Dylan Thomas's "Under Milk Wood" (Columbia (EMI), 1965; Resteamed, 2016) – with Bobby Wellins
 Laughin' & Scratchin'  (Jazz House, 1966)
 Alice in Jazz Land (Columbia (EMI),1966; Resteamed, 2007)
 Die Jazz Werkstatt '66 (NDR, 1966) – one track only, Tracey session with Kenny Wheeler and Bobby Wellins otherwise unissued
 In Person (Columbia (EMI), 1966)
 UK Live 1967 Vol. 1 (Jazzhus Disk, 1967; issued 2012) – at the Manchester Sports Guild, with Ben Webster
 UK Live 1967 Vol. 2 (Jazzhus Disk, 1967; issued 2012) – at the Manchester Sports Guild, with Ben Webster and Ronnie Scott
 With Love from Jazz (Columbia (EMI), 1967) – with Bobby Wellins
 The Latin American Caper (Columbia (EMI), 1968)
 We Love You Madly (Columbia (EMI), 1968)
 Free an' One (Columbia (EMI), 1969; retitled Wisdom In The Wings, Resteamed, 2021) – with Peter King
 The Seven Ages of Man (Columbia (EMI), 1969)
 Perspectives (Columbia (EMI), 1970)
 Alone at Wigmore Hall (Cadillac, 1974)
 Captain Adventure (Steam, 1975; Tentotem)
 Under Milk Wood (RCA, 1976; Steam) – with Donald Houston 
 The Bracknell Connection (Steam, 1976)
 Hello Old Adversary! (Steam, 1979)
 South East Assignment (Steam, 1980)
 The Crompton Suite (Steam, 1981)
 Soul Street (1982)
 The Poets' Suite (Steam, 1984)
 Now (Steam, 1985)
 Live at Ronnie Scott's Hexad (Steam, 1985; Linn)
 Stan Tracey Plays Duke Ellington (Mole, 1986; TAA, 2001)
 Genesis and More (Steam, 1987)
 We Still Love You Madly (Mole, 1988; TAA, 2001) – with Roy Babbington
 Portraits Plus (Blue Note, 1992)
 Live at the QEH (Blue Note, 1993)
 For Heaven's Sake (Cadillac, 1995)
 Solo: Trio (Cadillac, 1997)
 Comme D'Habitude (Jazzizit, 1998)
 The Durham Connection (33 Jazz, 1998)
 Stan Tracey Quartet with Phillip Madoc (2001)
 Live at the Savage Club (SAVAjazz, 2001) – with Andrew Cleyndert
 Zach's Dream (Trio, 2002)
 Seventy Something (Trio, 2003)
 The Last Time I Saw You (Trio, 2004) – with Peter King
 Just You, Just Me (Avid, 2003) – with Danny Moss
 Suspensions & Anticipations (psi, 2003) – with Evan Parker
 Live at the Appleby Jazz Festival (Trio, 2004)
 For All We Know (Trio, 2005)
 Crevulations (psi, 2005) – with Evan Parker
 Khumbula (Remember) (Ogun, 2005) – with Louis Moholo-Moholo
 Let Them Crevulate (Trio, 2005) – with Guy Barker
 Play Monk (Resteamed, 2006) – with Bobby Wellins
 The London Session (Dox, 2006)
 Senior Moment (Resteamed, 2008)
 The Later Works (Resteamed, 2009)
 Sound Check (Resteamed, 2010)
 A Child's Christmas (Resteamed, 2011)
 The Flying Pig (Resteamed, 2012)

As sideman
With Guy Barker
 Isn't It (Spotlite, 1991)
With Acker Bilk
 Blue Acker (Columbia (EMI), 1968)
With Don Byas
 Autumn Leaves (Ronnie Scott's Jazz House, 1965)
With Al Cohn and Zoot Sims
 Al And Zoot In London (World Record Club, 1965, reissued on Harkit)
With Stan Getz
 Live In London (Harkit, 1964)
 Live In London Volume 2 (Harkit, 2004) – recorded in 1964
With Benny Golson
 Three Little Words (Ronnie Scott's Jazz House, 1965)
With Johnny Griffin
 Live In London (Harkit, 1963)
With Paul Gonsalves and Tubby Hayes
 Just Friends (Columbia (EMI), 1964 or 1965)
With Joe Harriott
 Personal Portrait (Columbia (EMI), 1967) – three tracks only
With J. J. Johnson
 Live in London (Harkit, 1964)
With Laurie Johnson
 Synthesis (Columbia (E), 1969; Redial, 1998)
With Rahsaan Roland Kirk
 Live In London (Harkit, 1964)
With Prince Lasha
 Insight (CBS, 1966)
With Yusef Lateef
 Live in London (Harkit, 1964)
With Wes Montgomery
 Body And Soul (Ronnie Scott's Jazz House, 1965)
With Sal Nistico
 Live In London (Steam, 1985)
With Mike Osborne
 Tandem (Ogun, 1976)
With Sonny Rollins
 Live In London (3 volumes, Harkit, 1965)
With Charlie Rouse
 Playin' In The Yard (Steam, 1987)
With Ronnie Scott
 When I Want Your Opinion, I'll Give It To You (Ronnie Scott's Jazz House, 1963–1965)
With Ronnie Scott and Sonny Stitt
 The Night Has A Thousand Eyes (Ronnie Scott's Jazz House, 1964)
With Alan Skidmore
 East To West (Miles Music, 1989)
With Danny Thompson
 Elemental (Antilles, 1990)
With Ben Webster
 Ben Webster At Ronnie Scott's 1964 (Storyville, 1964)
 Soho Nights Volume 1 (ReSteamed, 1968)
 Soho Nights With Stan Tracey - Vol. 2 (ReSteamed, 1964)
 Webster's Dictionary (Pye/Philips, 1970)
With Jimmy Witherspoon
 Live in London (Harkit, 1966)

Film soundtracks
 Stolen Hours (US: Summer Flight, 1963), with Tubby Hayes a.o.

With Sonny Rollins
 Alfie (1966)

References

External links
 – official site
Stan Tracey re-releases

"Ken: 'You never got into drugs, did you?' Stan: 'Of course I did!' Jazz-lover and Conservative MP Ken Clarke talks to his hero Stan Tracey about playing - and partying - with the greats", The Guardian, 13 November 2006
 Stan Tracey obituary by John Fordham in The Guardian, 6 December 2013

1926 births
2013 deaths
20th-century British musicians
20th-century British pianists
21st-century British pianists
British jazz composers
British jazz pianists
British male composers
British male pianists
Commanders of the Order of the British Empire
Honorary Members of the Royal Academy of Music
Male jazz composers
Ivor Novello Award winners
People from Denmark Hill
Royal Air Force personnel of World War II